Li Huayang (born 24 January 1987) is a Chinese footballer currently playing as a goalkeeper for Nantong Zhiyun.

Club career
Li Huayang would be promoted to the senior team of Chongqing Lifan and go on to make his debut in a 2011 Chinese FA Cup game on 4 May 2011 against 	Beijing Baxy in a 3-0 victory. He would be used as a reserve choice goalkeeper behind Zhang Lei as the club went on to win the division title and promotion to the top tier at the end of the 2014 China League One season. Li would join another second tier club in Beijing IT, where he would gain significantly more playing time, but would unfortunately be part of the team that was relegated at the end of the 2015 China League One season. 

The following season, Li would join third tier club Nantong Zhiyun and would go on to establish himself as a regular as the team went on to gain promotion to the second tier at the end of the 2018 China League Two campaign. A constant regular within the team, he would help establish the club within the division and was part of the squad as they gained promotion to the top tier at the end of the 2022 China League One season.

Career statistics
.

Honours

Club
Chongqing Lifan
China League One: 2014

References

External links

1987 births
Living people
Chinese footballers
Association football goalkeepers
China League One players
China League Two players
Chongqing Liangjiang Athletic F.C. players
Beijing Institute of Technology F.C. players
Nantong Zhiyun F.C. players